Scenes of City Life is a 1935 Chinese comedy-drama film directed by Yuan Muzhi. It is also translated as Cityscape. It is noted for being the first film directed by Yuan, as well as the first film appearance of Lan Ping, the future Jiang Qing and Mao Zedong's fourth wife.

Cast 
Bai Lu
Lan Ping (Jiang Qing)
Tang Na
Wu Yin
Zhou Boxun
Wu Yinxian

References

External links 

1935 films
1930s Mandarin-language films
Films directed by Yuan Muzhi
Chinese black-and-white films
1935 directorial debut films